West Burlington Memorial Church, also known as Christ Church, is a historic Episcopal church on NY 80 in West Burlington, Otsego County, New York. It was built in 1868 in the Gothic Revival style.  It is a one-story rectangular building, three bays wide and four bays deep.  The building is of wood-frame construction with board-and-batten siding.  It sits on a fieldstone foundation with a steep gable roof and broad overhanging eaves.  The roof is surmounted by a wooden bell cote.

It was listed on the National Register of Historic Places in 2001.

References

Episcopal church buildings in New York (state)
Churches on the National Register of Historic Places in New York (state)
Carpenter Gothic church buildings in New York (state)
Churches completed in 1868
19th-century Episcopal church buildings
Churches in Otsego County, New York
National Register of Historic Places in Otsego County, New York